Matt Bowen (born 1982) is an Australian former rugby league footballer.

Matt Bowen may refer to:
 Matt Bowen (American football) (born 1976), American football player
 Matt Bowen (musician), American musician
 Matty Bowen, English rugby league footballer